Lake Mahinerangi is a lake formed when a dam was built on the Waipori River for hydroelectric generation. Construction of the dam started in 1903 and since 1907, power has been produced.

Naming
The lake was named for Dorothy Kathleen Mahinerangi Burnett. She was the daughter of William Burnett, who was mayor of Dunedin in 1911 and 1912. It is surrounded by farmland, tussock grasslands, and plantation forest.

Hydro-electric development

The tributaries of the Waipori River are in the Lammerlaw Range. This makes the gorge an ideal site for a hydro-electric scheme. The first proposals to develop the river for hydro-electric generation were prepared in 1900, for powering gold mining dredges. However, the plans were eventually altered to supply power to Dunedin city and surrounding districts. Construction began in early 1903.

The generating plant commenced operation on 27 April 1907. Electricity was transmitted to Halfway Bush substation in Dunedin via two 33 kV lines. However, there was no storage built into the original scheme, and in the first year of operation, low flows in the river led to constraints on the generating capacity. Between 1907 and 1913, some storage lakes were created on tributaries, including an early concrete arch dam on Pioneer Creek.

There was opposition from gold mining interests that blocked the development of storage capacity on the Waipori River itself, because Waipori Flat was still being actively mined.  In 1920, the Dunedin City Corporation Empowering Act was successfully pushed through Parliament, against opposition from mining interests, to enable the use of the Waipori River as a hydro-electric reservoir.

The first dam was built in 1923, and later raised, but ultimately had to be abandoned because of inadequate foundations. A second Empowering Act of 1924 enabled another dam to be built further downstream, with work beginning in 1927, and completing in 1931. The new lake submerged the mining township of Waipori.

By 1955, two more generating stations had been built downstream from the original powerhouse. There have been further replacements and additions to generating capacity between the 1960s and 1980s.

Arms
At the southern end, the lake has two major arms, called Loch Luella and Loch Loudon.

Fishing
The lake is well stocked with brown trout and some perch.

Wind farm
Trustpower's Mahinerangi Wind Farm is located to the north of the lake.

Notes

References

 

Mahinerangi, Lake
Hydroelectric power stations in New Zealand
Taieri River